Kalule is a town in Luweero District in Central Uganda.

Location
The coordinates of the town are: 00 38 24N, 32 31 48E (Latitude:0.6400; Longitude:32.5300).

Overview
Kalule is one of the municipalities in Luweero District, the others being:

 Bamunanika - About , northeast of Kalule.
 Bombo - About , south of Kalule.
 Kalagala - About , southeast of Kalule
 Wobulenzi - About , north of Kalule
 Ziroobwe - About , east of Kalule.

Kalule is a rapidly expanding metropolitan area. It is a market town that attracts agricultural produce from farmers in Bbowa, Katende and Kayindu. There are large pig farms in Kwese, a suburb of Kalule. Merchandise that does not find market in Kalule is sent to markets farther south, including to Kampala, the largest city in Uganda, and the capital of the country.

Population
The population of Kalule is not publicly known, as of November 2010.

Landmarks
In Kalule or near the town there are several landmarks, including the following:

 The offices of Kalule Town Council 
 Kalule Central Market
 The Kampala-Masindi Highway - the highway traverses the town in a north - south direction
 The Kalule-Bamunanika Road - the road makes a T-junction with the Kampala-Masindi Highway at Kalule and continues east to Bamunanika, the location of one of the palaces of the Kabaka of Buganda.

External links
 Luwero District Portal

See also

References

Populated places in Central Region, Uganda
Cities in the Great Rift Valley
Luweero District